Brennand Farm is often claimed to be the true centre of Great Britain. This is about seven kilometres north-west of Dunsop Bridge - which has the nearest BT phone box to the 'true centre'.  A plaque reads “You are calling from the BT payphone that marks the centre of Great Britain”.

The location was calculated by Ordnance Survey as the centroid of the two-dimensional shape of Great Britain, including all its islands.
Haltwhistle claims to be the centre by a different method.

See also
Centre points of the United Kingdom

References

Geography of Ribble Valley
Geographical centres